The Pitarrilla deposit is a large  silver deposit located in north central  Mexico in the state of Durango. Pitarrilla represents one of the largest unexploited silver resources in Mexico and in the world having estimated reserves of 479 million oz of silver. The deposit also has reserves amounting to 157.2 million tonnes of ore grading 0.29% lead and 0.79% zinc.

See also 
List of silver mines

References 

Silver mines in Mexico